Nerdcore is a genre of hip hop music characterized by subject matter considered of interest to nerds and geeks.  Self-described nerdcore musician MC Frontalot has the earliest known recorded use of the term (to describe this genre) in the 2000 song "Nerdcore Hiphop". Frontalot, like most nerdcore artists, self-publishes his work and has released much of it for free online. As a niche genre, nerdcore generally holds to the DIY ethic, and has a history of self-publishing and self-production.

Though nerdcore rappers rhyme about anything from politics to science fiction, there are some perennial favorites in nerdcore subject matter, including Star Wars, role-playing games, science, fantasy and computers.

Music with similar themes, but different musical styles can be found in the filk and geek rock genres. There are hip hop artists who have recorded compositions which focus on similar topics, but who are not generally considered nerdcore. Examples would be Blackalicious, a group which does not claim to be nerdcore, despite science-oriented songs like "Chemical Calisthenics", and MF DOOM, who was heavily inspired by comic book supervillains but is generally seen as more conventional hip hop. Conversely, one does not need to concentrate on those topics to be nerdcore: most of the songs by Frontalot do not focus narrowly on stereotypically nerdy topics. The difference is largely one of self-identification; the group Blackalicious does not identify as "nerds", while Frontalot does.

Sound
Being more defined by lyrics, nerdcore has no unifying musical sound, and the sound of nerdcore varies wildly from artist to artist. One common theme, especially in the early days of the genre, is uncleared sampling. MC Frontalot addressed this directly in his 1999 song "Good Old Clyde", a thank you of sorts to Clyde Stubblefield for the "funky drummer" break - which was sampled to provide the song's beat. Sources for samples in nerdcore range from Vanilla Ice  to Wolfgang Amadeus Mozart ("Rondo Alla Turca", in MC Plus+'s "Computer Science for Life"). YTCracker's  Nerdrap Entertainment System is an entire album made up primarily of samples from 8-bit Nintendo games. Another notable artist, Random, created an album dedicated to the Mega Man video games in 2007 titled MegaRan. Though some artists have moved away from this—Frontalot, for example, completely remixed several songs to remove uncleared samples before releasing them commercially on his 2005 album Nerdcore Rising—it is still quite common, as most nerdcore tracks are released non-commercially and thus attract little to no attention from the RIAA.

Several DJs have provided beats and done remixes for multiple nerdcore artists, most notably Baddd Spellah, who currently mixes the majority of Frontalot's tracks. Spellah also won a remix competition in 2004.

History

The earliest known recorded use of the term "nerdcore hip hop" was in 2000 by MC Frontalot. However, prior to that time artists as varied as the Beastie Boys, Kool Keith, Deltron 3030, MC 900 Ft. Jesus, MC Paul Barman, Dr. Dre, Company Flow, and MF Doom began exploring topics far outside the traditional hip-hop culture, including stereotypically "nerdy" topics like space and science fiction. Though these underground artists were generally outside geek culture and are not considered nerdcore, they can be said to have set the stage for artists like Frontalot, who has listed several of them as influences. Beastie Boys outer-space sci-fi themed album Hello Nasty in 1998; including, among other potentially influencing tracks, the spacey robotic "Intergalactic" and the distinctively video game sound themed song "Unite"; garnered mainstream recognition years ahead of the popular movement. Nerdcore had clear influences from geek culture as well, including geek rockers like They Might Be Giants, parodists like "Weird Al" Yankovic (who released a rap called "I Can't Watch This" in 1992, as well as "It's All About The Pentiums" in 1999 and "White & Nerdy" in 2006), and others. 

In the summer of 2004 the fledgling genre took a large step forward when the popular web comic Penny Arcade held its first convention, The Penny Arcade Expo, in Bellevue, WA.  Though the expo was primarily devoted to video and table top gaming, geek-friendly musicians also performed including Penny Arcade's "official rapper" MC Frontalot and Optimus Rhyme.

The next year, two full concerts took place at the 2005 Penny Arcade Expo and included nerdy hip-hop acts MC Frontalot and Optimus Rhyme.  After the 2005 expo, all three acts would have the "nerdcore" label permanently affixed to them.  Thanks to the popularity of these acts, the nerdcore fan base began to form and in some cases those fans would go on to become nerdcore artists themselves.

Also in 2005, the new subgenre of geeksta rap (named for gangsta rap) emerged, largely independently of more traditional nerdcore. The difference was in both lyrics and attitude; the geeksta artists (mostly computer scientists) focused on proclaiming their prowess with computers and other technical abilities. This braggadocio led to the first nerdcore feud, between MC Plus+ and Monzy.

In 2006, nerdcore rapper Jason Z. Christie, AKA High-C created the first websites dedicated solely to the genre of nerdcore, NerdcoreHipHop.org and RhymeTorrents.com.  The sites quickly became the foundation of the scene's online community. Along with the websites, High-C also created the world's first all nerdcore hip-hop compilation CD.  The "Rhyme Torrents Compilation" consisted of numerous volumes and dozens and dozens of tracks by various artists.  Soon after the release of the cds, Nerdcore as a genre began getting mainstream press attention. High-C also appeared in Wired Magazine, the film Nerdcore For Life, and was removed from the release version of the documentary Nerdcore Rising.

Each summer from July 2008 to 2013, nerdcore rappers and other nerd music acts gathered in Orlando, Florida for an event named Nerdapalooza, a nerd music charity festival based on bringing various genres of "nerd music" together into one large production.

"Glitched: The Dutch Nerdcore Event" was the first major, all-nerdcore event to be held outside the United States. It took place at Club Panama in Amsterdam in February 2009 and featured the European premiere of the documentary Nerdcore For Life as well as performances of four rappers from the film, MC Lars, YTCracker, Beefy and MC Router.

As of the mid-to-late 2010s, a branch of Nerdcore has taken off of YouTube where musicians create songs about famous video games, movies, anime and other famous forms of media. This branch of Nerdcore has since branched off into a new sub-genre of Nerdcore called Otacore (mix of Otaku meaning a fan of Japanese culture and Nerdcore) or Anime Rap where artists rap about characters from anime. Famous artists of Otacore include Rustage, Daddyphatsnaps, Shao Dow, Shwabadi, Connor Quest, GameboyJones and None Like Joshua.

Film

Two feature-length documentaries about the world of nerdcore were completed in early 2008, Nerdcore Rising and Nerdcore For Life.  Nerdcore Rising, directed by New York filmmakers Negin Farsad and Kimmy Gatewood, follows nerdcore pioneer MC Frontalot as he embarked on his first US tour in 2006.  Nerdcore For Life by Chicago director Dan Lamoureux examines the genre as a whole and contains appearances by over three dozen of the best known performers in the scene.

Nerdcore Rising premiered at the SXSW Film Conference and Festival on March 9, 2008, Nerdcore For Life at the tenth annual Wisconsin Film Festival on April 5, 2008.

See also

 Alternative hip hop
 Chap hop

References

Further reading
 
 

 
Hip hop genres
1990s in music
2000s in music
2010s in music